Menéndez Márquez is a Spanish surname. In English the name is often spelled without the diacritics. It may refer to:

Francisco Menéndez Márquez (d. 1649), royal treasurer and interim governor of Spanish Florida
Juan Menéndez Márquez (d. 1627), royal treasurer and interim governor of Spanish Florida
Pedro Menéndez Márquez (d. 1600), governor of Spanish Florida
Tomás Menéndez Márquez (1643-1706), royal accountant of Spanish Florida